Kantemir Mikhailovich Berkhamov (born 7 August 1988) is a Russian footballer who plays as a central midfielder.

Club career
He made his debut in the Russian Premier League on 22 March 2009 for PFC Spartak Nalchik in a game against FC Rubin Kazan.

Career statistics

Club

Notes

References

External links
 

Circassian people of Russia
1988 births
Living people
Russian footballers
Russia youth international footballers
Association football midfielders
Sportspeople from Nalchik
PFC Spartak Nalchik players
Russian Premier League players
FC Nizhny Novgorod (2007) players
FC Ural Yekaterinburg players
FC Lokomotiv Kaluga players
FC Tosno players
FC Arsenal Tula players
FC Lokomotiv Moscow players